Anil Kumar Seth is a British professor of Cognitive and Computational Neuroscience at the University of Sussex.

Early life and education

Seth was born in England. His father, Bhola Seth, obtained a BSc from Allahabad University in 1945, before migrating from India to the United Kingdom to study engineering at Cardiff. Bhola Seth subsequently obtained a PhD in Mechanical Engineering at Sheffield. His mother, Ann Delaney, came from Yorkshire. Seth's family was based in rural Oxfordshire. His father was a research scientist at the Esso Research Centre in Abingdon, and won the veterans world doubles title in badminton in 1976.

Seth went to school at King Alfred's Academy in Wantage. He has degrees in Natural Sciences (BA/MA, Cambridge, 1994), Knowledge-Based Systems (M.Sc., Sussex, 1996) and Computer Science and Artificial Intelligence (D.Phil./Ph.D., Sussex, 2001). He was a Postdoctoral and Associate Fellow at The Neurosciences Institute in San Diego, California (2001-2006).

Career 
Seth is co-director (with Prof. Hugo Critchley) of the Sackler Centre for Consciousness Science, and editor-in-chief of Neuroscience of Consciousness. He was conference chair of the 16th meeting of the Association for the Scientific Study of Consciousness and continuing member 'at large' and is on the steering group and advisory board of the Human Mind Project. He was president of the Psychology Section of the British Science Association in 2017.

Publications
Seth has published over 100 scientific papers and book chapters, and is the Editor-in-Chief of the journal, Neuroscience of Consciousness. He is a regular contributor to the New Scientist, The Guardian, and BBC, and writes the blog NeuroBanter. He also consulted for the popular science book, Eye Benders, which won the 2014 Royal Society Young People’s Book Prize. An introductory essay on consciousness has been published on Aeon – The Real Problem – a 2016 Editor’s Pick. Seth was included in the 2019 Highly Cited Researchers List that was published by Clarivate Analytics.

Books
 Being You: A New Science of Consciousness (Faber & Faber, 2021) - Author
 Brain Twisters (Ivy Press, 2015) - Consultant
 30 Second Brain (Ivy Press, 2014) - Editor and co-author 
 Eye Benders (Ivy Press, 2013) - Consultant
 Modelling Natural Action Selection (Cambridge University Press, 2011) - Editor and co-author

Popularisation of science 
Seth appeared in the 2018 Netflix documentary The Most Unknown on scientific research directed by Ian Cheney.

See also 
 User illusion, an understanding of consciousness similar to Seth's

Weblinks 
 Anil Seth Finds Consciousness in Life’s Push Against Entropy (Interview in Quanta Magazine 2021)

References

External links
 
 Sackler Centre for Consciousness Science
 David Edelman and Anil Seth (2009). "Animal consciousness: a synthetic approach". Trends in Neurosciences
 "Criteria for consciousness in humans and other mammals". PubMed
 Anil Seth's TEDTalk "Your brain hallucinates your conscious reality" Recorded April 2017
 Anil Seth's Royal Institute talk "The Neuroscience of Consciousness" Recorded February 2017

1972 births
Living people
British neuroscientists
Alumni of the University of Sussex
Place of birth missing (living people)
Academics of the University of Sussex
British people of Indian descent